Yellowstone to Yukon Conservation Initiative or Y2Y is a transboundary Canada–United States not-for-profit organization that aims to connect and protect the 2,000 mile (3,200 kilometre) Yellowstone-to-Yukon region. Its mission proposes to maintain and restore habitat integrity and connectivity along the spine of North America's Rocky Mountains stretching from the Greater Yellowstone ecosystem to Canada's Yukon Territory. It is the only organization dedicated to securing the long-term ecological health of the region.

Since 1993, more than 450 partner groups have joined forces to support the shared mission and vision. Y2Y's work is a collaborative effort of conservation groups, government agencies, Indigenous governments, landowners, wildlife scientists, planners, businesses, economists, and other individuals and groups interested in protecting native wildlife, ecological processes, and wilderness in the Rocky Mountains of North America. Existing national, state, and provincial parks and wilderness areas anchor the system, while the creation of new protected and special management areas provide the additional cores and corridors needed to complete it. This network is built upon the principles of conservation biology, various focal species assessments, the knowledge of local and traditional residents, and the requirements for sustainable economies.

Mission 
Connecting and protecting habitat from Yellowstone to Yukon so people and nature can thrive.

Primary role 
To achieve its vision across 2,000 mi (3,200 km), Y2Y protects core wildlife habitats, keeps those habitats connected and inspires others to engage in similar work.

Y2Y highlights and focuses on local issues that have implications for the region as a whole. The organization engages in landscape-scale conservation, an approach that focuses on actions and management across large areas, such as entire watersheds.

The organization's role is to set the context for regional conservation work by providing the vision for a healthy Yellowstone to Yukon landscape, and to bring partners together to achieve as a network what cannot be done by any one group alone. The initiative proposes a system of wildlife corridors linking core protected reserves with buffer zones acting to further protect the system from industrial and urban development.

History 
Between 1991 and 1993, Pluie, a wolf radio-collared in southern Alberta, was tracked as it traveled more than 100,000 square kilometers and covered an area 10 times the size of Yellowstone National Park and 15 times that of Banff National Park. Pluie crossed more than 30 different political jurisdictions (including three states, two provinces, private lands, and First Nation’s territories) before being shot and killed in a legal hunt south of Kootenay National Park in December 1995.

The scientific research Pluie's movements showed wildlife needed larger areas than biologists thought and pointed to a need to connect large sections of habitat along the spine of the Rocky Mountains as the best method to ensure there would be wildlife and wild spaces thriving into the future. Other animals such as lynx, cougars, golden eagles and bull trout have also been recorded traveling distances of more than 1,000 mi (1,600 km). These movements inspired people to reconsider the scale nature needs to thrive and also launched the formative idea behind Y2Y.

The Yellowstone-to-Yukon region is one of the most ambitious corridor projects on the North American continent. Since 1993 Yellowstone to Yukon's conservationists have supported wildlife crossings over and under highways, helped track wolverines and purchased more than 500,000 acres of land to preserve wildlife routes.

Yellowstone to Yukon Conservation Initiative's mission and model has inspired other similar collaborations including:  
Algonquin to Adirondacks Collaborative to connect lands and people from Algonquin Provincial Park in Ontario, Canada to the Adirondacks in New York State 
Great Eastern Ranges Initiative in Australia to connect reserves along 2,235 mi (3,600 km) of the Great Eastern Ranges 
Two Countries-One Forest to connect the Northern Appalachian-Acadian ecoregions of Canada and U.S. 
Baja to Bering Marine Initiative between Baja, California and Bering Sea off the Pacific Coast of North America

Priorities 
Working successfully over such a large transboundary landscape with a diversity of challenges and opportunities, Y2Y's mission demands a multi-pronged approach and engages on projects within the following eight themes:

Private lands: works with willing property owners to secure land and maintain key connections for wildlife.	
Protected areas and public lands: identifies core habitat under risk of development and finds ways to protect it.
Policy: Y2Y is a voice for the Yellowstone to Yukon region in advancing policies and practices that support the Yellowstone to Yukon vision.
Transportation: helps make roads safer for both human travel and wildlife movement.
Co-existence: supports education programs and tools that assist people to share space with wildlife.
Appropriate development: assesses whether development is consistent with its vision and speaks out when it brings more damage than benefit.
Habitat restoration: heals damaged forests and streams to increase the habitat available for wildlife.
Promoting the vision: spreads its vision for a connected Yellowstone-to-Yukon landscape via its ever-growing networks.

In popular culture 
The story of Pluie the wolf inspired a storyline on the television show The West Wing. The season 1 episode, The Crackpots and These Women, has a character played by Nick Offerman proposing the construction of an "1,800 mile wolves-only roadway" to White House Press Secretary C. J. Cregg.

Photography and media 
A 2005 book by Karsten Heuer, Walking the Big Wild: From Yellowstone to the Yukon on the Grizzly Bears' Trail, detailed the wildlife biologist and park warden's 18-month journey with his dog from Yellowstone National Park in Wyoming to the Canadian Yukon by hiking, skiing, and paddling across mountains, forests, and rivers.

In 2011, Yellowstone to Yukon: the Journey of Wildlife and Art, a collaborative exhibition curated by the National Museum of Wildlife Art, the Whyte Museum of the Canadian Rockies, artist Dwayne Harty, cofounder Harvey Locke and the Yellowstone to Yukon Conservation Initiative featured images, art and stories from the Yellowstone-to-Yukon region, and was eventually published as a book.

A 2016 episode of Nova titled Wild Ways  featured Y2Y's work and how newly established wildlife corridors offer hope to the planet's endangered species.

See also
Algonquin to Adirondacks Collaborative
American Prairie
Animal migration
Canadian Parks and Wilderness Society
Ecology of the Rocky Mountains
Insular biogeography
Landscape-scale conservation
National Parks of Canada
National Park Service

References

External links

Transboundary protected areas
Nature conservation organizations based in Canada
Ecology of the Rocky Mountains
Landscape ecology
Nature conservation organizations based in the United States